Adrian von der Linde (1610 – 1682) - Patrician and Lord Mayor of Danzig.

Lord Mayor of Danzig
 1630 - 1631 - This likely refers to another person with same name, please see disambiguation.
 21 March 1647 - 17 March 1648
 17 March 1650 - 21 March 1651
 26 February 1654 - 16 March 1655
 21 March 1658 - 20 March 1659
 16 March 1662 - 13 March 1663
 18 March 1666 - 17 March 1667
 20 March 1670 - 19 March 1671
 15 March 1674 - 21 March 1675
 6 September 1676 - 17 March 1678
 13 March 1681 - 19 March 1682

Disambiguation
It appears that there was another person with that name living in Danzig at the same time:
Adrian von der Linde (16 December 1579 – 14 April 1631) trader, probably also a member of the town council or Lord Mayor.

See also
 Administrations of Danzig before April 1945

References
 Online Encyclopedia of the Leaders of Nations and Territories.
 Genealogie und Familiengeschichte Lemmel/Lämmel (source about another person with same name)

History of Gdańsk
1610 births
1682 deaths